Young King may refer to:

Henry the Young King, the eldest son and heir apparent of King Henry II of England, crowned as King of England during his father's reign
Young King (magazine)
Young King (Seneca chief)

See also
The Young King by Oscar Wilde